West Plains is a locality in the Southland Region of New Zealand, northwest of Invercargill and north of Otatara. Ōreti River and its tributary Makarewa River flow through the plains. It is part of the Southland Plains.

West Plains School was established c.1882. It was merged to Grasmere School in January 2005.

Demographics

West Plains-Makarewa had a population of 1,608 at the 2018 New Zealand census, an increase of 99 people (6.6%) since the 2013 census, and an increase of 243 people (17.8%) since the 2006 census. There were 594 households. There were 852 males and 756 females, giving a sex ratio of 1.13 males per female. The median age was 45.5 years (compared with 37.4 years nationally), with 297 people (18.5%) aged under 15 years, 207 (12.9%) aged 15 to 29, 873 (54.3%) aged 30 to 64, and 231 (14.4%) aged 65 or older.

Ethnicities were 94.0% European/Pākehā, 11.8% Māori, 2.1% Pacific peoples, 1.7% Asian, and 1.7% other ethnicities (totals add to more than 100% since people could identify with multiple ethnicities).

The proportion of people born overseas was 7.6%, compared with 27.1% nationally.

Although some people objected to giving their religion, 52.1% had no religion, 37.9% were Christian, 0.6% were Buddhist and 1.3% had other religions.

Of those at least 15 years old, 174 (13.3%) people had a bachelor or higher degree, and 345 (26.3%) people had no formal qualifications. The median income was $37,000, compared with $31,800 nationally. 249 people (19.0%) earned over $70,000 compared to 17.2% nationally. The employment status of those at least 15 was that 756 (57.7%) people were employed full-time, 237 (18.1%) were part-time, and 30 (2.3%) were unemployed.

References

External links
West Plains in The Cyclopedia of New Zealand (1905)

Populated places in Southland, New Zealand
Suburbs of Invercargill